Pernell (floruit 1350), was an English healer.

She assisted her physician husband, Thomas de Rasyn in their professional practice. The couple was accused of causing the death of a miller in 1350, but was freed by a royal pardon and allowed to continue their practice. Their medical skills were respected by people of the time.

References

Year of birth missing
Year of death missing
14th-century English medical doctors
Medieval women physicians
Cunning folk
14th-century English women
14th-century English people